Maska (Greek: Μάσκα; English: Mask) is a successful studio album by Greek artist Glykeria. It was released in early 1998 by Sony Music Greece and comprises the previous single Anapnoi Anatoli. The album was certified Gold by IFPI Greece.
The album also includes three well-known collaborations including internationally renowned Natasha Atlas and Pashalis Terzis.

Track listing

Chart performance
Maska was a successful album in Cyprus and Greece. The album was certified Gold in Greece within four months of its release.

1998 albums
Glykeria albums
Greek-language albums
Sony Music Greece albums